Orla (derived from Polish orzeł 'eagle') is a distinct Polish armorial estate and heraldic clan coat of arms adopted in Polish heraldry since the Crown of the Kingdom of Poland. It was vested upon several knightly families of Poland's nobility situated in the historical region of Greater Poland, Silesia and Lesser Poland from about the 14th century, where it was first historically known in Poland as the coat of arms of 'Saszor' [Szaszor], later 'Orla', and subsequently conferred  on the ennoblement of several individuals.

History
Orla is one of the oldest Polish coats of arms. The coat of arms was naturalised into Polish heraldry during the Jagiellonian dynasty; it is a derivative of its Roman-German origin-precursor attributed to the personal coat of arms borne by the House of Saszowski and its branch scions.

The Polish Orla coat of arms was subsequently borne as well by several unrelated Polish knightly families and individuals connected by heraldic adoption at ennoblement, and as frequently found with Polish coats of arms, by some supposed members misattributed to the heraldic clan by error or usurpation.

Blazon
Silver (Argent), an eagle displayed headless red (Gules), on the neck a star of six rays red (gules); N.B. the star, as well as the eagle claws, are often found represented (rightly or wrongly) as gold (Or) tincture in Polish heraldic literature.

Notable member bearers
From the classical Polish heraldic reference Herby rycerstwa polskiego (Armorials of Polish Knights) published in 1584 by Bartosz Paprocki, bearers shown in order of precedence:
 House of Saszowski [Szaszowski] (historically equally written as Schaschowsky, Saschowsky et al.), and its branch scions alias Palczowski and Gierałtowski.
 Jakub Saszowski of Gierałtowic (equally known as Gierałtowski), Burgrave of Kraków and Wawel Royal Castle
  (equally known as Palczowski), (b. 1530, d. 1587), Burgrave of Kraków and Wawel Royal Castle
  (b. about 1507, d. 1565)
  (b. about 1568, d. 1627)
  (b. about 1570, d. about 1609)
 House of Barski
 House of Chobienicki
and the individuals:
 Jorogniewski
 Kełbowski
 Ligocki

See also
 Polish heraldry
 Heraldic clan
 Szlachta
 Coat of arms
 Szaszor

References

Polish coats of arms
Silesian nobility